The Colt New Police is a double-action, six-shot revolver (which can also be fired single action). This gun was chambered in the .32 New Police, which is dimensionally identical to a flat-nose version of the .32 S&W Long, except for the nose shape. In addition to the .32 New Police cartridge, the revolver was available in 32 Colt. The diameters of the two cartridges are not the same, with the 32 Colt being approximately 0.020 inches smaller in diameter than the New Police. Although the 32 Colt can be loaded and fired in the New Police chamber, it is not recommended to do so.  It is impossible to load the .32 New Police in a 32 Colt chamber. The later .32 New Police chambering was more popular than the 32 Colt chambering.

The Colt New Police was manufactured from 1896 to 1907 by Colt's Manufacturing Company of Hartford, Connecticut. The sights on the revolver were fixed with a round blade in front and a grooved rear sight. The revolver was available with a -inch, four-inch, or six-inch barrel in a blued or nickel finish and hard rubber grips. The Colt New Police was selected by New York City (NYPD) Police Commissioner Theodore Roosevelt in 1896 to be the first standard-issue revolver for NYPD officers.

A target version was made until 1905 with a 6-inch barrel and adjustable sights.

The New Police Revolver was replaced in the Colt catalog in 1907 by the improved Colt Police Positive, which featured an internal hammer block safety and better lock work.

References

External links

Colt revolvers
Police weapons